The Catholic Naqib (Urdu کاتھولک نقیب) is the oldest Urdu-language Catholic magazine, founded in Lahore, Pakistan in 1929 by Roman Catholic Archdiocese of Lahore. It was originally published by Lahore Press and, since 1997, by Naqib Printing Press. Naqib (نقیب) is an Arabic name that means "herald" or "Proclaimer". The Naqib is one of the oldest magazines in the history of Pakistani journalism. It was founded by the Bishops of Pakistan in 1929.

History
According to Mr. Gulzar Chohan, a former editor of Catholic Naqib, the magazine began in 1916 as an "Urdu News Letter" written by a Belgian Capuchin Priest. At the same time, an English Weekly "Catholic News" was published from the Lahore Diocese under the patronship of Bishop Fabien Eestermans.

Father Livinus was part of the first team of Belgian Capuchin Missionary in West Punjab, now Punjab in Pakistan. He emphasized the promotion of Christian Literature in India and supported the publication of Christian literature in local languages. He established a board of publication that included Father Victorius Banken Gerardus, Father Desiderius Sury Carolus, and Father Vincentius Stevens Daniel.

Fr. Livinus is not only the Founder of Catholic Naqib but, also a founder of "Punjab Vernacular Society (1922)." The Society was established to provide stationary to the parishes. The printing of the Naqib was also the responsibility of the Punjab Vernacular Society.

Two editors of the Naqib later became the Archbishop and Bishop of Pakistan.

Archbishop Lawrence John Saldanha represented The Archdiocese of Lahore, and Bishop Andrew Francis represented the Multan Diocese of Pakistan.

L.J Saldanha (Archbishop Emeritus,  living in Canada), continues to be involved with the Catholic Naqib. He founded Wave Studio Lahore and the Radio Radio VERITAS Urdu Service. He served the Naqib as editor-in-chief with the help of Mr. Gulzar Chohan. Mr. Chohan began to write a permanent column named "my Vision -میں نے دیکھا" on social and political issues while Saldanha began to write a column "I made him show a vision - میں نے دیکھایا".

Naqib Digest
They (Archbishop Emeritus & Mr. Gulzar Chohan) increased a few more pages in Catholic Naqib’s publication to add “Naqib Digest” for the women and children, so that Catholic Naqib became a “Real Family Magazine” in their period! Miss Frida Durani and Miss Nasirah Paul were the Editors of “Naquib Digest” So Catholic Naqib became religious as well as social, political and Family Digest. Before that, it is majorly a reprehensive of Christian religious activities.

Archbishop Armando Trindade became a Patron of Catholic Naqib in 1990. Trindade is the first Archbishop of the Lahore Archdiocese. During his apostolate, Lahore Diocese was erected to Archdiocese.

Printing Press
The first printing press in the Naqib was installed by Archbishop Armando Trindade.  The Vernacular Society was responsible for printing but it never got its own printing press; Trindade set up two boards to run the Catholic Naqib. The "Editorial Board" was responsible for publishing contents of Naqib and the head of the board was Father Zicheria Ghauri, Parish Priest of Narowal, and the "Managing Board" headed by Raymond Razario, ex-director of Caritas Lahore, and looked after the financial needs of the institute and its staff. Mr. Rana Tabassum was the Coordinator of these boards and in charge of meetings.

Naqib's Marketing Team

A marketing team was hired that worked on commission and partial salary system with travel allowance. The head of the team was again Mr. Rana Tabassum. The circulation of Naqib was raised to 5000-6000 copies. Mr. Akhtar Ramzan (photo editor too) and Mr. Akhtar Bhatti were the leading sales officers. In the photo Mr.Akhtar Bhatti is half sitting man on arm of chair just in the left while Mr. Akhtar Ramzan is just standing behind the bride (Miss Parveen – Zubaira Rana!

Archbishop Trindade disapproved of the inflation of price due to the slogan of Naqib and its motto to evangelization. Even Naqib was not eligible for ABC advertisements (state advertising policy) to evade the external intervention. The Naqib always published on the public approach lines and never on benefice lines.

Naqib Forum
During the Patronship of Armando Trindade the Naqib Media House carried out all the activities.
Naqib Forum was instituted. 
Classical singers like Ustad Hamid Ali Khan performed on Naqib Farm.

The "Naqib Forum" and "Marketing Team" will remain incomplete unless it includes the names of donors whose generosity was provided in exchange for advertising and printing services or simply by seasonal greetings and messages. Due to their generous contribution in financial assistance, the "Naqib Forum Program" and the series of interviews continued.

The names of these donors are as follows: Fr. James CHANAN – Provincial Dominican Order, The Late Mr. Nathaniel Nawab – Principal of Christian Technical College Gujranwala, Ex. Fr. Saleem Anjum – Assistant Rector Capuchin Minor Seminary Lahore, Ex. Fr. Pascal Clement – Rector Capuchin Minor Seminary Lahore, Fr. Abid Habib – Provincial Capuchin Order and The Late Lt. Col (ret) L. C. Rath – Principal of Saint Anthony Boys School Lahore and later Director of Bathania Hospital Sialkot.

These donors like the Naqib’s Staff, as well as the Christian public of Pakistan, want to see the Naqib as the “Daily." The obstacle and hindrance in the daily publication regarding Naqib will be discussed under “Critic Topic.”

Press Card
The first time in Naqib's history from 1929, the press card was designed and introduced by Rana Tabassum in 1992 while serving the Naqib as "News Editor" as well as "Circulation Manager!
The press card was promulgated by the cooperation and assistance of Mr. Chishty, additional secretary of “Lahore Secretariat of Information and Press”! So access to cultural events and access to work place became easier, at least during bike ride restrictions by traffic Police!

Team Inayat Bernard and Nadeem Francis
Fr. Inayat Bernard and Fr.Nadeem Francis worked in a team for the Naquib and for the journalism. They also promoted the literal activities. After Naquib service Fr. Anayat Bernard has become Rector of Minor Seminary of Lahore so he opens the door of the seminary’s EPI and Conferences’ Room for the writers and journalists. He organized frequent journalistic workshops (news-editing), special nights in the honor of poets and writers (literary festivals). There were book-launch ceremonies and so on.
The duo of Inayat Bernard and Nadeem Francis has another particular identity. During their time in Naqib : They made the Naquib recognized on the world stage, like in Christian journalist association such as UCIP Switzerland. This Duo organizes many workshops in Pakistan for young journalists on news-editing on an international level with the partnership of UCIP. The participations were made to assure from every continent because UCIP represents every continents of the World.
The introductory address of the late editor Gulzar Chohan on history of Pakistani Journalism during the young journalist's seminar in Pakistan in 1990, is an important dissertation on the history of “Catholic Naqib” and its editors: – (Ref. editions Naqib june1990 Page 7)

The Naqib was the inspiration of two Catholic laymen, Radja Sakra Mehdi of Dalwal, and Ghulam Qadir of Lahore.  In 1932, Mr. L. Banerji, followed by his sons, took over the management of the Naqib until 1934. Then, a priest was appointed as editor. From 1934 on, the paper became a fortnightly publication.

Current events
Fr. Andrew Francis was the editor-in-chief of the Naqib in the late 1970s.

Until July 1987 Fr. Inayat Bernard was the editor of the Catholic Naqib.

The Catholic Naqib is a professionally run paper with regular training like the workshop for reporters held at St. Mary's Minor Seminary, Lahore in 1989, which brought together reporters from Bahawalpur, Karachi, Lahore, Multan, Peshawar and Sheikhupura. Father Francis Nadeem was editor-in-chief of Catholic Naqib and Gulzar Chuhan became editor in 1989.

On March 11, 2008, a powerful bomb ripped open a government building, killing at least 30 people and injuring about 200 more, as well as damaging Catholic Church buildings in Lahore. The explosion caused serious damage to the Sacred Heart Cathedral, Sacred Heart High School for Boys, Sacred Heart High School for Girls, and the office of the Naqib.

The Catholic Naqib celebrated its 80th anniversary on May 16, 2009. Victor Daniel, Editor, board members and the office staff received certificates of appreciation from Archbishop Lawrence Saldanha.

There was great joy in the Archdiocese of Lahore around the 90th anniversary of the Catholic Naqib in 2019.

From 2013 to 2020, Father Khalid Rehmat O.F.M. Cap. was editor of the Naqib.

Rana Tabassum ex. Assistant Editor and Manager is the only award winner laureate editor among the Catholic Naqib's other editors. He is awarded the "Media in Your Country award in 1998 at UNESCO Center Paris

References

Magazines established in 1929
Catholic Church in Pakistan
Magazines published in Pakistan
Urdu-language magazines
Catholic magazines
Mass media in Lahore
Non-profit organisations based in Pakistan